Aghu, or Central Awyu, is a Papuan language of South Papua, Indonesia. It may actually be two languages, depending on one's criteria for a 'language'. The two varieties are: Mappi River Awyu (Aghu) and Pasue River (Pasuwe River) Awyu (Nohon, ?Mitak).

Phonology 
The phonology of the Aghu language:

At the ends of words, vowels may appear both long and nasalized. This occurs historically where there was a final nasal /m/ or /n/. Within words, rather than nasal vowels there are sequences of vowel plus nasal consonant which matches the articulation of the following consonant. Thus nasal vowels may be analyzed as /Vn/ or /VN/.

References

Further reading

External links
Aghu at the Awyu–Ndumut research group at VU University Amsterdam
OLAC resources in and about the Aghu language
OLAC resources in and about the Central Awyu language
OLAC resources in and about the Jair Awyu language
OLAC resources in and about the North Awyu language

Languages of western New Guinea
Awyu–Dumut languages